The Takshanuk Mountains are a mountain range in Southeast Alaska, United States that separate the Chilkoot and Chilkat watersheds and also form the northern portion of the Chilkat Peninsula.

Notable peaks include Mount Ripinski, Peak 3920, and Tukgahgo Mountain.

Primary access to the mountains is via the community of Haines or the Haines Highway.

Mountain ranges of Alaska
Mountains of Haines Borough, Alaska